NGC 4596 is a barred lenticular galaxy located about 55 million light-years away in the constellation Virgo. NGC 4596 was discovered by astronomer William Herschel on March 15, 1784. NGC 4596 is a member of the Virgo Cluster and has an inclination of about 38°.

Physical characteristics
NGC 4596 has a strong bar with bright ansae at the ends. Two diffuse spiral arms branch off from the ends of the bar and form an inner pseudoring that is well-defined. The spiral arms continue out and fade rapidly in the bright outer disk.

Supermassive black hole
NGC 4596 has a supermassive black hole with an estimated mass of 78 million suns ( M☉).

See also
 List of NGC objects (4001–5000)
 NGC 4608
 NGC 1533

References

External links

Virgo (constellation)
Barred lenticular galaxies
4596
42401
7828
Astronomical objects discovered in 1784
Discoveries by William Herschel
Virgo Cluster